Gianlorenzo Baraldi (born 30 October 1940 in Parma) is an Italian costume designer and film producer. He won a Nastro d'Argento for Best Scenography and a David di Donatello for Best Sets and Decorations for the film Il Marchese del Grillo by Mario Monicelli in 1982.

Biography
Lorenzo Baraldi studied at the faculty of set design of the Istituto d'Arte Paolo Toschi in Parma, Italy, and attended set decoration classes at the Accademia di Belle Arti di Brera in Milan. He taught set decoration at the Accademia di Belle Arti in Viterbo from 1993 to 1995, at the Centro Sperimentale di Cinematografia from 1994 to 1995, at the Accademia di Costume e Moda in Rome from 1995 to 1998, at the Associazione Scenografi Costumisti e Arredatori from 1998 to 1999, at the Istituto Europeo di Design (I.E.D.) during the academic year 2005–2006, and at the campus for arts students of the Sannio Film Festival in the years 2008 and 2009. He made a series of lectures on scenography and scenotechnics at the Istituto d'Arte Paolo Toschi in Parma in the winter of 1996 and in 2000–2001.

Baraldi began his career in cinema as a set decorator for the film Tepepa (1968), directed by Giulio Petroni. He created the sets of various films and television productions, including The Roses of the Desert, The Two Lives of Mattia Pascal, Bertoldo, Bertoldino e Cacasenno, All My Friends Part 2, Il Marchese del Grillo, Hurricane Rosy, Lovers and Liars, An Average Little Man, Goodnight, Ladies and Gentlemen, My Friends (film), and many others.

Baraldi has also worked for directors outside Italy, such as French director Georges Lautner, on the film Le Guignolo (1980),  and Michael Radford, on Il Postino: The Postman (1994).

Baraldi was involved in the creation of the 43 columns of the atrium of the Cultural Centre of the Alhóndiga Bilbao in Spain. The history of this project is the subject of a 2010 documentary film.

Filmography
Production
 43 Colonne in scena a Bilbao (2010), documentary by Leonardo Baraldi and Eleonora Sarasin

Production design

 La notte che Evelyn uscì dalla tomba (1971), by Emilio Miraglia
 I due assi del guantone (1971), by Mariano Laurenti
 La dama rossa uccide sette volte (1972), by Emilio P. Miraglia
 Tony Arzenta – Big Guns (1973), by Duccio Tessari
 Sessomatto (1973), by Dino Risi
 Romanzo popolare (1974), by Mario Monicelli
 Profumo di donna (1974), by Dino Risi
 Amici miei (1975), by Mario Monicelli
 Signore e signori, buonanotte (1976), by Mario Monicelli
 Un borghese piccolo piccolo (1977), by Mario Monicelli
 Dove vai in vacanza? (1978), in three episodes, by Mauro Bolognini, segments "Le vacanze intelligenti" and "Sarò tutta per te"
 Viaggio con Anita (1979), by Mario Monicelli
 Temporale Rosy (1980), by Mario Monicelli
 I seduttori della domenica (1980), in four episodes, segment 4 "Roma (Armando's Notebook)", by Dino Risi
 Io e Caterina (1980), by Alberto Sordi
 Nudo di donna (1981), by Nino Manfredi
 Il marchese del Grillo (1981), by Mario Monicelli
 Amici miei atto II (1982), by Mario Monicelli
 Grog (1982), by Francesco Laudadio
 Io so che tu sai che io so (1982), by Alberto Sordi
 Storia di Piera (1983), by Marco Ferreri
 Bertoldo, Bertoldino e Cacasenno (1984), by Mario Monicelli
 Le due vite di Mattia Pascal (1985), by Mario Monicelli
 Joan Lui - Ma un giorno nel paese arrivo io di lunedì (1985), by Adriano Celentano
 La coda del diavolo (1986), by Giorgio Treves
 I giorni randagi (1988), by Filippo Ottoni
 Musica per vecchi animali (1989), by Stefano Benni together with Umberto Angelucci
 Errore fatale (1991), TV film, by Filippo De Luigi
 Caldo soffocante (1991), by Giovanna Gagliardo
 Piedipiatti (1991), by Carlo Vanzina
 Condannato a nozze (1993), by Giuseppe Piccioni
 Il Postino: The Postman (1994), by Michael Radford
 Palla di neve (1995), by Maurizio Nichetti
 Carogne (1995), by Enrico Caria
 Bruno aspetta in macchina (1996), by Duccio Camerini
 Gli eredi (Les héritiers) (1997), TV, by Josée Dayan
 Trenta righe per un delitto (1998), miniseries, by Lodovico Gasparini
 Frigidaire - Il film (1998), by Giorgio Fabris
 Baci e abbracci (1999), by Paolo Virzì
 Amore a prima vista (1999), by Vincenzo Salemme
 Rosa e Cornelia (2000), by Giorgio Treves
 I cavalieri che fecero l'impresa (2001), by Pupi Avati
 Resurrezione (2001), miniseries, by Paolo e Vittorio Taviani
 La guerra è finita (2002), miniseries, by Lodovico Gasparini
 Luisa Sanfelice (2004), miniseries, by Paolo e Vittorio Taviani
 Al di là delle frontiere (2004), TV, by Maurizio Zaccaro
 Il bell'Antonio (2005), miniseries, by Maurizio Zaccaro
 Le rose del deserto (2006), by Mario Monicelli
 Fuga sul Kenya (2008), by Gabriele Iacovone
 Trilussa - Storia d'amore e di poesia (2013), by Lodovico Gasparini

Art direction

 La notte che Evelyn uscì dalla tomba (1971), by Emilio Miraglia
 Vogliamo i colonnelli (1973), by Mario Monicelli
 Tony Arzenta – Big Guns (1973), by Duccio Tessari
 Romanzo popolare (1974), by Mario Monicelli
 L'anatra all'arancia (1975), by Luciano Salce
 Pummarò (1990), by Michele Placido
 Baci e abbracci (1999), by Paolo Virzì
 Honolulu Baby (2001), by Maurizio Nichetti
 Il bell'Antonio (2005), miniseries, by Maurizio Zaccaro
 Volesse il cielo! (2002), by Vincenzo Salemme

Set decoration
 Tepepa (1968), by Giulio Petroni
 T'ammazzo! - Raccomandati a Dio (1968), by Osvaldo Civirani
 La moglie del prete (1971), by Dino Risi
 I due assi del guantone (1971), by Mariano Laurenti
 L'uccello migratore (1972), by Steno
 Tony Arzenta – Big Guns (1973), by Duccio Tessari
 Caro Michele (1976), by Mario Monicelli
 Le Guignolo (1980), by Georges Lautner

Costume design
 La notte che Evelyn uscì dalla tomba (1971), by Emilio Miraglia
 Continuavano a chiamarli i due piloti più matti del mondo (1972), by Mariano Laurenti
 La dama rossa uccide sette volte (1972), by Emilio P. Miraglia
 Signore e signori, buonanotte (1976), by Mario Monicelli

References

External links
 
 Personal page of Lorenzo Baraldi
 Biography cineuropa

Italian costume designers
Italian production designers
Living people
Film people from Parma
Brera Academy alumni
1940 births